Ricarda Walkling (born 19 March 1997) is a German footballer who plays as a midfielder for Werder Bremen.

Club career
Walkling started her career in 2002 with SV Obergriesbach and spent two years at TSV Schwaben Augsburg from 2008 to 2010 before moving to the youth ranks of FC Bayern Munich in 2010. With Bayern Munich junior, she won the 2013 German Championship, scoring the equalizer in the final against FSV Gütersloh 2009, a game that ended 3–1 in favour of Bayern Munich. She made her first team debut in the second round of the DFB-Pokal on 29 September 2013. Soon after, on 6 October 2013 she made her Bundesliga debut against BV Cloppenburg as an 89th-minute substitute for Vanessa Bürki and a few moments later netted her first team debut goal to confirm the 5–2 victory. In the 2013–14 season, beside her appearances for the first team she also played for the junior team, who won their second consecutive title on 31 May 2014 after a 1–0 victory in the final over Turbine Potsdam.

International career
Walkling debuted for the national U-16 team on 11 September 2012 in Hamburg in a 3–1 victory against Norway. She won the Nordic Cup in July 2013 in Iceland with the U-16 team after four wins. On 30 January 2013, she debuted for the national U-17 team in Carson City against United States in an exhibition game that ended 1–1. On 11 October 2013, she scored a hattrick against Switzerland in a European Championship qualifier 6–0 victory. She was part of the U-17 squad to play at the 2014 UEFA Women's Under-17 Championship in England, winning all the matches (including a 3–1 win in the penalty shoot-out against Spain in the final). At this tournament she also grabbed two goals in the 4–0 victory at the group stage against France as well as the 1–0 winning goal in the semifinals against Italy.

Honours
Bayern Munich
 Bundesliga: 2014–15, 2015–16

Germany U17
 UEFA Women's Under-17 Championship: 2014

References

External links
 
 
 
 
 Ricarda Walkling at fcbayern.de
 Ricarda Walkling at soccerdonna.de

1997 births
Living people
Footballers from Hanover
German women's footballers
FC Bayern Munich (women) players
NC State Wolfpack women's soccer players
SV Werder Bremen (women) players
Women's association football midfielders
Expatriate women's soccer players in the United States
German expatriate sportspeople in the United States
German expatriate footballers
TSV Schwaben Augsburg players